The men's épée was one of eight fencing events on the fencing at the 1988 Summer Olympics programme. It was the twentieth appearance of the event. The competition was held from 23 to 24 September 1988. 79 fencers from 33 nations competed. Each nation was limited to 3 fencers. The event was won by Arnd Schmitt of West Germany, the nation's second victory in the event (matching Belgium, Cuba, and Hungary for third-most). France's Philippe Riboud took silver, adding to his 1980 and 1984 bronze medals to become the third man to earn three medals in the individual épée. Andrey Shuvalov earned the Soviet Union's first medal in the event since 1968 with his bronze.

Background

This was the 20th appearance of the event, which was not held at the first Games in 1896 (with only foil and sabre events held) but has been held at every Summer Olympics since 1900.

Three of the eight quarterfinalists from 1984 returned: two-time bronze medalist Philippe Riboud of France and fifth-place finishers Alexander Pusch of West Germany and Michel Poffet of Switzerland. Pusch had previously won gold in 1976 (not competing in 1980 due to his country joining the American-led boycott). Riboud had won the World Championship in 1979 and 1986. The reigning World Champion, Volker Fischer, competed on the West German team in the team event but was not one of the nation's three fencers in the individual competition.

Aruba, Bahrain, Jordan, and Paraguay each made their debut in the event. Belgium, France, Great Britain, Sweden, and the United States each appeared for the 18th time, tied for most among nations.

Competition format

The 1988 tournament used a three-phase format very similar to that of 1984, though the second phase (double elimination) round expanded from 16 to 32 fencers.

The first phase was a multi-round round-robin pool play format; each fencer in a pool faced each other fencer in that pool once. There were three pool rounds: 
 The first round had 15 pools of 5 or 6 fencers each, with the top 4 in each pool advancing.
 The second round had 12 pools of 5 fencers each, with the top 5 in each pool advancing.
 The third round had 8 pools of 6 fencers each, with the top 4 in each pool advancing.

The second phase was a truncated double-elimination tournament. Four fencers advanced to the final round through the winners brackets and four more advanced via the repechage.

The final phase was a single elimination tournament with a bronze medal match.

Bouts in the round-robin pools were to 5 touches; bouts in the double-elimination and final rounds were to 10 touches.

Schedule

All times are Korea Standard Time adjusted for daylight savings (UTC+10)

Results

Round 1

Round 1 Pool A

Round 1 Pool B

Round 1 Pool C

Round 1 Pool D

Round 1 Pool E

Round 1 Pool F

Round 1 Pool G

Round 1 Pool H

Round 1 Pool I

Round 1 Pool J

Round 1 Pool K

Round 1 Pool L

Round 1 Pool M

Round 1 Pool N

Round 1 Pool O

Round 2

Round 2 Pool A

Round 2 Pool B

Round 2 Pool C

Round 2 Pool D

Round 2 Pool E

Round 2 Pool F

Round 2 Pool G

Round 2 Pool H

Round 2 Pool I

Round 2 Pool J

Round 2 Pool K

Round 2 Pool L

Round 3

Round 3 Pool A

Round 3 Pool B

Round 3 Pool C

Round 3 Pool D

Round 3 Pool E

Round 3 Pool F

Round 3 Pool G

Round 3 Pool H

Double elimination rounds

Winners brackets

Winners group 1

Winners group 2

Winners group 3

Winners group 4

Repechages

Repechage 1

Repechage 2

Repechage 3

Repechage 4

Final round

Final classification

References

Epee men
Men's events at the 1988 Summer Olympics